The Arab Socialist Action Party was a Pan-Arab political party, formed by the right-wing faction of the Arab Nationalist Movement after the latter's disintegration. The general secretary of the party was Dr. George Habash and the organ of the party was Tariq at-Thawra.

Sections of the party included:
Iraq: Arab Socialist Action Party – Iraq
Jordan: Jordanian Revolutionary People's Party
Lebanon: Arab Socialist Action Party – Lebanon
Palestine: Popular Front for the Liberation of Palestine
Saudi Arabia: Arab Socialist Action Party – Arabian Peninsula

References

Anti-Zionism in the Arab world
Anti-Zionism in the Middle East
Anti-Zionist political parties
Arab nationalist militant groups
Arab Nationalist Movement breakaway groups
Arab nationalist political parties
Defunct political parties in Lebanon
Defunct socialist parties in Iraq
Defunct socialist parties in Jordan
Pan-Arabist political parties
Political parties with year of disestablishment missing
Political parties with year of establishment missing
Popular Front for the Liberation of Palestine
Secularism in the Arab world
Socialist parties in Lebanon
Socialist parties in Saudi Arabia
Socialist parties in the Palestinian territories
Transnational political parties